Afan (also Romanized as Āfān) is a village in Mangur-e Sharqi Rural District, Khalifan District, Mahabad County, West Azerbaijan Province, Iran. At the 2006 census, its population was 160, in 25 families.

References 

Populated places in Mahabad County